Cowbridge Road East is a major road in western-central Cardiff the capital of Wales. It is the principal road which passes through the busy district of Canton and connects Cowbridge Road West in the western districts to central Cardiff. The road is partly on the A4161. It is eventually crossed by Cathedral Road towards the city centre.  It is home to numerous shops, pubs and restaurants.

References

Roads in Cardiff
Streets in Cardiff